The University of Milano-Bicocca (UNIMIB) is a public university located in Milan, Italy, providing undergraduate, graduate and post-graduate education. Established in 1998, it was ranked by the Times Higher Education 2014 ranking of the best 100 Universities under 50 years old as number 21 worldwide and first in Italy.

Campus
The University of Milano-Bicocca is located in an area on the northern outskirts of Milan, which was occupied by the Pirelli industrial complex until the late 1980s. The industrial area has been redesigned by architect Vittorio Gregotti into an urban complex, including the University of Milano-Bicocca's research laboratories and student residence halls.

History
The University of Milano-Bicocca has its origins from the splitting of the University of Milan, which with about 90,000 students in the 1990s was becoming overcrowded. 
A large area in the north of Milan, the Bicocca, was chosen as the location for the new university. This area was occupied by the Pirelli industrial complex until the 1980s and the new campus was part of a larger urban renewal project.
The university was officially established on 10 June 1998.

Milan-Bicocca is a multidisciplinary university which offers a wide range of academic programs in different disciplinary fields: Economics, Informatics, Statistics, Law, Education, Sociology, Medicine and Surgery, Mathematics, Natural Sciences, Physics and  Astrophysics, Chemistry, Computer Sciences, Biotechnology and Psychology.

Organization

There are fourteen Departments and two Schools at the University of Milan-Bicocca:

 Department of Economics Management and Statistics
 Department of Business and Law
 Department of Statistics and Quantitative Methods
 ↑ School of Economics

 Department of Biotechnology and Biosciences
 Department of Physics 
 Department of Informatics, System and Communication 
 Department of Mathematics and its Applications 
 Department of Materials Science 
 Department of Earth and Environmental Sciences 
 ↑ School of Science

 Department of Law

 Department of Medicine and Surgery

 Department of Psychology

 Department of Human Sciences for Education 

 Department of Sociology and Social Research 

The number of students at the university has grown steadily since it opened: in its first academic year there were 15,300 students, which had risen to 27,481 in 2003-2004 and by 2005-2006 there were over 30,000. In 2023 the number of students is almost 40.000.

See also
 ESDP-Network
 List of Italian universities
 Milan
 University of Milan

References

External links
University of Milano-Bicocca Website 

Educational institutions established in 1998
Universities in Milan
1998 establishments in Italy